Fereej Al Manaseer is a district in Qatar, located in the municipality of Al Rayyan.

In the 2015 census, it was listed as a district of Zone 55 which has a population of 283,675 and also includes Bu Sidra, Al Aziziya, Al Waab, Fereej Al Soudan, Muaither, Al Mearad, New Fereej Al Ghanim, Fereej Al Murra and Al Sailiya.

Geography
It borders Bu Sidra to the south, Al Aziziya to the east, Baaya to the north and Muaither to the north and west.

Transport
Currently, the underground Al Manaseer Metro Station is under construction. Once completed, it will be part of Doha Metro's Gold Line. Construction was launched during Phase 2A.

Education

The following school is located in Fereej Al Manaseer:

Landmarks
Fereej Al Manaseer Park on Al Hummaid Street.

References

Populated places in Al Rayyan